Hodson is a former settlement in Calaveras County, California. A post office operated at Hodson from 1898 to 1906, and again from 1915 to 1917.

The town was named in honor of J.J. Hodson, a copper mining financier.

References

External links

Former settlements in Calaveras County, California
Former populated places in California